Velvet Gloves and Spit is the third album by Neil Diamond. His first for MCA's Uni label, it included three low-charting singles: "Brooklyn Roads" (No. 58), "Two-Bit Manchild" (No. 66) and "Sunday Sun" (No. 68).

Upon its initial release in 1968, the album had 10 songs. After the success of Diamond's next three albums, it was re-issued in October 1970 with a new sleeve and included a remake of "Shilo", a song that had previously been recorded for Bang Records and had appeared on the preceding album, Just For You. His motivation for doing this was the release of the song as a single by his old record label with a new backing track and different vocal take recorded at Chips Moman's American Studios in Memphis, and its chart position at No. 24 outselling Diamond's concurrently released single "Until It's Time for You to Go", which reached No. 53.

The album sleeve states that "Much credit for 'The Pot Smoker's Song' must go to the kids of Phoenix House in New York City. Without the cooperation and frankness of these young ex-drug addicts who are still struggling to find their way back, this 'song' never could have been done." On early UK copies, "The Pot Smoker's Song" was replaced by a b-side titled "Broad Old Woman (6 A.M. Insanity)".

Cash Box called "Brooklyn Roads" a "nostalgia filled glimpse of the 'good old days' of childhood" that has "solid vocal and lyrical impact" as well as "excellent production work and reasonable dance appeal."

Track listing
All tracks written by Neil Diamond's .

1970 re-release

Arrangements
Artie Schroeck (tracks: A5), Don Costa (tracks: A1 to A3), Don Hockett (tracks: B4), Howard Johnson (tracks: B2), Joe Renzetti (tracks: B5, B1), Stuart Scharf (tracks: B3)

References

1968 albums
Neil Diamond albums
Uni Records albums
Albums arranged by Don Costa
Albums produced by Tom Catalano